Abul K. Abbas is an American pathologist at University of California San Francisco where he is Distinguished Professor in Pathology and former chair of its Department of Pathology. 
He is senior editor of the pathology reference book Robbins and Cotran Pathologic Basis of Disease along with Vinay Kumar, as well as Basic Immunology, and Cellular & Molecular Immunology. He was editor for Immunity from 1993-1996, and continues to serve as a  member of the Editorial Board.  He was one of the inaugural co-editors of the Annual Review of Pathology: Mechanisms of Disease for issues from 2006-2020.
He has published nearly 200 scientific papers.

Selected books
 Kumar V, Abbas A, Aster J, editors. Robbins & Cotran Pathologic Basis of Disease. 10th Ed. Elsevier 2020.

Awards and honors
 2021: ASIP Gold-Headed Cane Award, American Society for Investigative Pathology (ASIP)
 2010: ASIP Robbins Distinguished Educator Award, ASIP

References

Year of birth missing (living people)
Living people
Indian emigrants to the United States
American pathologists
Members of the National Academy of Medicine
All India Institute of Medical Sciences, New Delhi alumni
University of California, San Francisco faculty
Harvard Medical School people
Annual Reviews (publisher) editors